Tuḥfat al-ʿIrāqayn (“Gift of the Two Iraqs”) (also known as Ḵatm al-ḡarāʾeb) is one of greatest works of the Persian poet Khāqānī. After court intrigues, Khaqani set out on the Hajj to Mecca in 1156/57, after which he composed this work. It consists of five parts and is essentially a description of the poet's travels. Its final version dates from 552/1157.
Tuḥfat al-ʿIrāqayn is the only mas̄navī (long poem in rhyming couplets) written by this poet.

References

Encyclopædia Britannica
Iranica: ḴATM AL-ḠARĀʾEB

Persian poetry